Sharkenstein is a sharksploitation film from 2016 directed by Mark Polonia and was written by J.K. Farlew.

Premise 
In World War II there was an attempt to weaponize sharks. The Third Reich shut down the efforts before they could complete the experiment. Now, more than half a century later in a small ocean town citizens are terrorized by a mysterious and blood thirsty creature, one that seems to be a monster created by different parts of the most fierce sharks to ever have lived. Dr. Klaus attempts to create the ultimate killing machine by using human organs and body parts.

Synopsis 
Three friends travel to Katzman Cove for a boating trip only to find the town terrorized by an abominable Nazi super shark.

Cast 
Greta Volkova as Madge

Ken Van Sant as Duke Lawson

Titus Himmelberger as Coop

James Carolus as Skip

Jeff Kirkendall as Klaus

Yolie Canales as Angry Mother

Bruce Applegate as Doctor

Kathryn Sue Young as Bonnie Boom Boom

Reception 
Nerdspan states, "Flawed, but not entirely in the right way."

References 

2016 films
Films directed by Mark Polonia
Films about sharks
2010s English-language films